Jakob Neber (January 29, 1891 – June 23, 1968) was a German politician of the Christian Democratic Union (CDU) and former member of the German Bundestag.

Life 
Neber was a member of the first German Bundestag from 1949 to 1953, into which he was elected for the CDU via the Rhineland-Palatinate state list.

Literature

References

1891 births
1968 deaths
Members of the Bundestag for Rhineland-Palatinate
Members of the Bundestag 1949–1953
Members of the Bundestag for the Christian Democratic Union of Germany